European Bat lyssavirus may refer to:
European Bat lyssavirus 1
European Bat lyssavirus 2